The Suffolk County Football Association is the governing body for football in the county of Suffolk, England.

Football in Suffolk before formation

Before the formation of the Suffolk County football Association, the county lacked both a football and a rugby association. However, this is not to say that before 1885 there was no desire for one, for an unsuccessful call for an Eastern Counties Football Association was projected from the Essex Standard in 1881.

Furthermore, on 3 November 1883, a columnist of the Ipswich Journal announced that "An Eastern Counties Football Association is an institution so much needed that if volumes were to be written nothing more conclusive could be said in its favour than it would give a locus standi to the game, which would cause it to be followed with far more vigour than at present."

History

Suffolk FA was formed in 1885 and had eleven founder member clubs, they were, Ipswich Association (now Ipswich Town), Ipswich School, Ipswich Rangers, Cowell's Club (Ipswich), Stowmarket, Bury Town, Bury School, Beccles College, Sudbury Town, Framlingham College and Woodbridge Town

The first President of the Association was The Duke of Hamilton, his presidency ran between 1885 and 1894.

There were 41 registered referees shown in the County handbook for the 1903–1904 season, compared with the figure in today's book of over 400.  In the same 1903–1904 handbook there are 100 clubs shown, that were affiliated to the Association, compared with today's figure of over 600.

Key dates in the history of the Association are provided below:

1898 – In 1898 a County Fixture was held against Aston Villa, who at the time were the previous season's F.A. Cup Holders. The gate receipts for this game was £238 5s. 4d. in comparison the Senior Cup Final of 1905 realised gate receipts of £48 12s. 6d.

1907–14 – The period 1907 to 1914 saw the years of "the split" when there were two associations, one affiliated to the F.A. and the other to the A.F.A.  In 1914 the F.A. and A.F.A. effected a compromise which resulted in the association being again a harmonious and united body.

1935 – On 20 March 1935 Suffolk County Football Association held its Jubilee celebration, amongst the guests was Stanley Rouse, later to become Sir Stanley.  It was reported in the programme for this celebration that over the previous fifty years the progress on interest in the game had been 'wonderful' and that there was hardly a village which did not possess a football club and that practically each town had its own charity competition.

1946 onwards – Again interrupted by war during 1939–1945 the County F.A. started the era after World War II with J.W. Yallop continuing as Hon. Secretary, a post he held since 1919 and would continue to hold until 1960.  In addition to J.W. Yallop the county has only had four other Hon. Secretaries since the Second World War, E.A. Brown, B.A.H. Collings, W.M. Steward and Martin Head.  E.A. Brown was made a life member of this association in 1980 and its president in 1986.

1985 – A Centenary Banquet was held at Ipswich Moat House on 30 September 1985 to celebrate its 100th birthday. Sir Stanley Rous, C.B.E., Hon. President of FIFA and Hon. Vice-President of the Football Association, proposed the toast to the SCFA.

2000 – The Suffolk County Football Association became a Limited Company in 2000.

2001 – For the first time in its history in April 2001 the County F.A. appointed two full-time employees, namely Will Cook, County Development Officer and James Payne, Clerical Officer, and both gentlemen were installed at the new County FA office at Felaw Maltings in Ipswich.

2003 – In April 2003, the Association moved its headquarters to purpose built offices in Stowmarket; which were officially opened by FA Vice-Chairman Ray Kiddell.

2003 – In July 2003, Martin Head became the first salaried Secretary in the Association's history.

2005 – Suffolk defeated Hampshire 2 – 1 at Portman Road, Ipswich in 2005 to win the FA County Youth Cup. This was actually the county's first ever Cup Final appearance.

2006 – In 2006, all disciplinary administration transferred from volunteers to staff at the Association's HQ.

2007 – Suffolk's 2nd FA County Youth Cup Final appearance was in April 2007. Suffolk drew 1 – 1 with West Riding after extra time at Valley Parade, Bradford. However, West Riding won the match 4 – 3 on penalties.

Today the Association is served by President G.S. Blake (elected in 2001) and Chairman David Porter in addition to the board of Directors, Honorary Officers and the members of Council.

Football Development

The Suffolk FA is committed to developing the game at every level. The aim of the development team is to make a positive difference within football, and to give everyone the opportunity to access quality football opportunities and experiences to fulfil their potential. They are keen to develop partnerships to promote the benefits of football and improve the facilities where football is played.

Governance

Football Services is a core function of the County Football Association. This involves the day-to-day running of key areas such as the administration of clubs, leagues and referees along with the running of the discipline process, County Competitions and our representative teams.

The Suffolk FA Football Services Department offers advice on all aspects and all questions no matter how trivial they may seem.

Affiliated Leagues

Men's Saturday Leagues
Anglian Combination**
Suffolk and Ipswich League**
Essex and Suffolk Border Football League**
Lowestoft and District League
St Edmundsbury League**

Footnote: **Part of the English football league system.

Youth Leagues
Ipswich and Suffolk Youth League
South Suffolk Youth League
Norfolk and Suffolk Youth League
Suffolk WAYS League

Men's Sunday Leagues
Bury and District Sunday Football League
Ipswich and District Licensed Trades League
Ipswich Sunday League
Lowestoft Sunday League
Sudbury and District Sunday League

Ladies and Girls Leagues
Suffolk Girls and Women's League

Other Leagues
Norfolk and Suffolk Veterans League

Small Sided Leagues
Premier Fives – Chantry, Cornard, Hadleigh, Ipswich, Stowmarket & Sudbury
Suffolk Sixes – Felixstowe, Haverhill & Bury St Edmunds (Male and Female)
Champion Soccer – Ipswich
Raw Soccer – Lowestoft
Prostar Leagues – Ipswich, Bury St Edmunds & Lowestoft

Disbanded or Amalgamated Leagues

A number of leagues that were affiliated to the Suffolk County FA have disbanded or amalgamated with other leagues including:

Bury and District League (became the St Edmundsbury League)
East Anglian League (amalgamated with the Norfolk and Suffolk League in 1964 to become the Anglian Combination)
Eye and District League
Felixstowe & District Junior League (now known as the South Suffolk Youth League)
Ipswich & District League (became the Suffolk and Ipswich League)
Ipswich and District Sunday Youth League (merged with the Suffolk and Essex Youth Combination to become the Ipswich and Suffolk Youth League)
Ipswich Boys Combination (became the Ipswich & District Sunday Youth League)
Norfolk and Suffolk League (amalgamated with the East Anglian League in 1964 to become the Anglian Combination)
North Suffolk League
Stowmarket and District League
Suffolk and Essex Youth Combination (merged with the Ipswich and District Sunday Youth League to become the Ipswich and Suffolk Youth League)
Waveney Youth League
West Suffolk Football League

Affiliated Member Clubs

Among the notable clubs that are (or were at one time) affiliated to the Suffolk County FA are:

AFC Sudbury (merger of Sudbury Town and Sudbury Wanderers)
Achilles
Beccles Town
Brantham Athletic (formerly Brantham & Stutton United)
Bungay Town
Bury Town
Cornard United
Crane Sports
Debenham Leisure Centre
Felixstowe & Walton United (merger of Felixstowe Town and Walton United)
Framlingham Town
Haverhill Rovers
Hadleigh United
Ipswich Wanderers
Ipswich Town
Kirkley & Pakefield
Leiston
Long Melford
Lowestoft Town
Mildenhall Town
Needham Market
Newmarket Town
Ransomes Sports (formerly Orwell Works and RSSC Ransomes)
Stowmarket Town
Sudbury Town (merged with Sudbury Wanderers to form AFC Sudbury)
Sudbury Wanderers (merged with Sudbury Town to form AFC Sudbury)
Team Bury
Walsham-le-Willows
Whitton United
Woodbridge Town

County Cup Competitions

The Suffolk County FA run the following Cup Competitions:

Suffolk FA Premier Cup
Suffolk FA Senior Cup
Suffolk FA Senior Reserve Cup
Suffolk FA Junior Cup
Suffolk FA Primary Cup
Suffolk FA Sunday Cup
Suffolk FA Sunday Shield
Suffolk FA Sunday Trophy
Suffolk FA Veterans Cup
Suffolk FA Women's Cup
Suffolk FA Boys U15 Minor Cup
Tesco Suffolk FA Boys U13 Cup
Tesco Suffolk FA Girls U16 Cup
Tesco Suffolk FA Girls U14 Cup
Ipswich Inter-Firm Cup

Source

Suffolk Premier Cup

The Suffolk Premier Cup is a county cup competition involving senior teams affiliated to the Suffolk County Football Association.

Suffolk Senior Cup

The Suffolk Senior Cup is a county cup competition involving senior teams affiliated to the Suffolk County Football Association.

List of Suffolk Junior Cup Winners

Source:

List of Suffolk Primary Cup Winners

Source:

List of other Suffolk Cup Competition Winners

Source

Directors & Officials

Board of Directors
 Gordon Blake (President)
 David Porter - Chairman 
 Jon White - Finance Director  
 Laura Smith- Chief Executive  
 Bruce Badcock
 David Steward 
 Andy Wilding

Key Officials
Laura Smith (Chief Executive)
Chris Walsh (County Development Manager)
Jairo Marin (Football Services Manager)
Colin Hills (County Referee Development Manager)
 Jim Hill (County Welfare Officer)

References

External links

County football associations
Football in Suffolk
Sports organizations established in 1885